Elisabeth Darina Laracy Silone (30 March 1917 – 25 July 2003) was an Irish journalist, translator and anti-fascist.
She was the wife of the writer Ignazio Silone from 1944 until his death in 1978.

Life
Born in Rathgar, Dublin, Laracy had three sisters, Cecily, Moira, and Eithne. She graduated in 1937 in history and political science from University College Dublin. By 1939, Laracy had an MA. She went to France, where she had a scholarship to study for her doctorate at the Sorbonne. In 1940, she moved to Italy, visiting Milan briefly and then settling in Rome, where she worked as a correspondent for the Herald Tribune and the International News Service. This brought her attention from the fascist regime, which wanted her to collaborate with them. When she refused, she was forced to flee to Switzerland.
Laracy was initially based in Bern, where she gave a full account to the chief intelligence officer. However her visa was for 15 days and eventually she could not get a further extension. She moved to Zurich when an English publisher commissioned her to write a book on the situation in Italy. It was in the libraries there that she met Ignazio Silone, who was also in exile. She convinced Silone to let her assist him in his work against the fascist regime in Italy, and, in October 1944, they returned to Rome. They were married two months later.

Capable of speaking six languages Laracy worked on the translations of his works and after his death she used his notes to complete the unfinished novel Severina.

References

Further reading
Michele Dorigatti e Maffino Maghenzani, Darina Laracy Silone. Colloqui, Perosini Editore, Zevio, 2005
Andrea Paganini, Tra amore e spionaggio in casa Silone, in Giornale del Popolo, 15 April 2006
Giovanni Casoli, Colloqui con Darina, in Città nuova, 10 May 2006

Irish journalists
Irish anti-fascists
People from Rathgar
Alumni of University College Dublin
1917 births
2003 deaths
20th-century Irish translators
20th-century journalists
Female anti-fascists
Irish expatriates in France
Irish emigrants to Italy